Cole Keith (born 7 May 1997) is a Canadian rugby union player who generally plays as a prop for the Toronto Arrows of Major League Rugby (MLR). He also represents Team Canada internationally.

Rugby career
Keith made his international debut for Canada against Chile on 11 February 2017.

Keith was included in the Canadian squad for the 2019 Rugby World Cup which was held in Japan for the first time. It also marks his first World Cup appearance.

Club statistics

References 

1997 births
Living people
Canadian rugby union players
Canada international rugby union players
Rugby union props
Toronto Arrows players
New England Free Jacks players